VGN Projects Estates Pvt. Ltd. is a multi million dollar  Indian real estate company headquartered in Chennai, Tamil Nadu. VGN primarily focuses on residential projects. It also engages in the development of commercial and institutional properties. VGN also has its own engineering, procurement and construction division which specialises in the construction of buildings, roads, bridges and pipelines .

History
Founded in the year 1942, VGN has developed in excess of 20 million square feet of real estate with over 50 projects in the city of Chennai. An ISO 9001:2008 certified company. V. Gurusamy Naidu was the founder of VGN group. In the year 1942 he started brick kiln factory and manufactured bricks in the name of VGN. He acquired land parcels basically to manufacture bricks in various locations. He worked hard to build good will and earned a name for VGN brand.

Sponsorships

VGN was the principal sponsor of Chennai Super Kings in the Indian Premier League Cricket 2012 – 2013. VGN has also sponsored various social events including Rotary International, Round Table Conference, Vintage Car Rally and other sports, cultural and charitable events.

Awards and honours
 Aircel Super Cup 2014
 Chennai Super Kings Super Cup winner
 V Raman Memorial Cup 2017
 South India's real estate Awards - Developers of the Year 2017
 Vijayavani Property Expo Awards 2015
 Zenith Cultural Fest Award
 Lifetime Achievement Award by Sulekha Properties
 ICICI Bank Awards
 India Bulls premier League Awards 2016
 Indian Express Property Expo Awards
 Prince of Arcot Trophy Runners Up 2013
 Prince of Arcot Trophy Runners Up 2014
 Maddys - Advertising club Madras Daily Thanthi – TV and Radio Awards 2017
 Vintage Car Rally awards.
 SAP invitational F15 Cricket Cup winner
 LIC HFL Ungal Illam awards 2013
 LIC HFL Ungal Illam awards 2017
 Economic Times Reality Convention Awards
 Estate South Award
 HDFC Preferred Developer Award

References

Real estate companies of India
Indian companies established in 1942
Companies based in Chennai
Real estate companies established in 1942